Goulburn Street is a street in Hobart, Tasmania. The street was named after the first official Colonial Secretary of New South Wales, Frederick Goulburn, who arrived in Sydney in 1820.

See also

References

Streets in Hobart